Palmas is a barrio in the municipality of Arroyo, Puerto Rico. Its population in 2010 was 3,789.

History
Puerto Rico was ceded by Spain in the aftermath of the Spanish–American War under the terms of the Treaty of Paris of 1898 and became an unincorporated territory of the United States. In 1899, the United States Department of War conducted a census of Puerto Rico finding that combined the population of Palmas, Ancones and Guásimas barrios was 596.

Special Community
Since 2001 when law 1-2001 was passed, measures have been taken to identify and address the high levels of poverty and the lack of resources and opportunities affecting specific communities in Puerto Rico.

Gallery

See also

 List of communities in Puerto Rico

References

External links

Barrios of Arroyo, Puerto Rico